Javadieh (also Romanized as Javādīeh; also known as Chambar Ghorbāl) is a village in Miyan Velayat Rural District, in the Central District of Mashhad County, Razavi Khorasan Province, Iran. At the 2006 census, its population was 423, in 121 families.

References 

Populated places in Mashhad County